Soy Luna (English: I am Luna) is an Argentine telenovela produced by Disney Channel Latin America that aired from March 14, 2016 to August 17, 2018. The first episode of Soy Luna premiered with over 2.3 million views in Argentina alone. Developed by Disney Channel Latin America and produced by Disney Channel Europe, the Middle East and Africa (EMEA), the series stars Karol Sevilla along with Ruggero Pasquarelli, Valentina Zenere and Michael Ronda. Soy Luna is the second original production of Disney Channel Latin America after of Violetta. The supporting cast features Agustín Bernasconi, Malena Ratner, Katja Martínez, Jorge López, Ana Jara, Chiara Parravicini, Gastón Vietto, Lionel Ferro, Carolina Kopelioff, Lucila Gandolfo, Rodrigo Pedreira, Ana Carolina Valsagna, David Murí, Ezequiel Rodríguez and Caro Ibarra. Estela Ribeiro, Roberto Carnaghi, Giovanna Reynaud, Pasquale Di Nuzzo, Jandino, Victoria Suárez Battan and Joaquín Berthold joined the main cast in later seasons. Luz Cipriota, Diego Alcalá, Germán Tripel, Antonella Querzoli and Paula Kohan used to also star on the show, but their characters were written off, whilst Bernasconi and Ferro left the series during the final season.

In May 2017, the series was renewed for a third and final season, which premiered on April 16, 2018. After the airing of the final episode, Disney broadcast a documentary titled Soy Luna: The Journey which recounts the main actors' most emotional experiences in the series over the last three years.

In November 2020, a documentary/special titled Soy Luna: El último concierto was officially announced. It was exclusively released to Disney+ on February 26, 2021.

Series overview

Season 1 (2016) 

Luna Valente is a 16-year-old girl who loves to roller-skate and lives with her adoptive parents in Cancún, Mexico, in the mansion where her parents work. Luna works as a delivery girl at a fast food joint with her best friend, Simon. On a delivery she bumps into a boy named Matteo. Matteo flirts with her and nicknames her Delivery Girl, Luna nicknames him Chico Fresa, a nickname meaning he is very conceited/rich.

However, her life is completely turned upside-down when the mansion's new owner, Sharon Benson arrives. Luna has a bad encounter with Sharon's goddaughter, Ambar, when she accidentally spills a milkshake on Ambar. Ambar then pushes her in the pool with her skates on. Luckily Matteo, who happens to be Ambar's boyfriend, saves her from drowning. Sharon is pleased with the work performance of Luna's parents and offers them double pay and to give Luna education in one of the best schools, if they go work in her manor in Buenos Aires, Argentina.

Forced to accept, Luna has to leave her friends, job, and life behind, but her transition is eased when she comes across the roller skating rink named the Jam & Roller, where her existing passion for roller skating is reinvigorated as she discovers the world of freestyle skate-dancing. The rink brings her new friends, Nina, Jim, and Yam, a new job as skating rink assistant, and a new passion. She's also forced to endure the challenges of a vigorous new school system. To make matters worse, Luna is targeted by Ambar, who goes to the same school where she is the most popular. Ambar uses her two best friends, Delfi and Jazmin to also target Luna.

Luna's best friend, Simon, decides to go after her, leading him to forming the Roller Band with Nico and Pedro (Part of the Staff at the Jam & Roller). Luna then begins to fall in love with Matteo, who like Ambar is the most popular at school.

Meanwhile, Sharon is threatened by her past as she discovers that her niece, Sol Benson is still alive. Many years ago Sharon had burned the manor down, leading to the death of her sister Lili and her husband, Bernie, who Sharon loved. Sharon believed Sol, daughter of Lili and Bernie, had also died in the fire. Sharon, as the closest legal relative to Bernie, changed her last name to Benson and kept Lili and Bernie's fortune. With the help of her personal assistant, Rey, she investigates to find out who and where is Sol Benson.

Meanwhile, many years back, a worker of the manor named Roberto helped little Sol Benson escape the fire. He left the baby girl at an orphanage in Mexico City. She was eventually adopted by Monica and Miguel Valente. They named her Luna because of the moon pendant she had. Destiny brought Luna/Sol back to her birth home and past without her knowing it.

Roberto ends up dying in a hospital. But he has the Sun part of Sol's pendant (which is a Sun and Moon that conjoin). He gives the Sun piece to a pair of hospital employees, Tino and Cato (two clumsy best friends), and asks them to go to the Benson Family to find and return it to Sol.

Sharon and Rey investigate any possible connection to the Benson Family, not knowing that Luna is actually Sol Benson. Sharon and Rey realize Tino and Cato aren't so smart so they stand no threat but they decide to keep them close as workers in the manor. Tino and Cato have their own storyline as they try to accomplish their mission given by Roberto. Cato also falls in love with Amanda, the house's maid.

Meanwhile, there are other storylines, like the rising of the Roller Band (Nico, Pedro, and Simon). Others include Nina's (Luna's new best friend) journey as FelicityForNow, an undercover account that lets her speak her real thoughts, while she is in love with Gaston, Matteo's best friend. Jim (Jimena) and Yam (Yamila) are two best friends who do everything together. They are both in love with Ramiro, an egotistic guy aspiring to live off his skating and rapping. But this all changes when Jim begins to fall for Nico and Ramiro falls in love with Yam. Another storyline is Jazmin and Delfi, Ambar's best friends and accomplices. They have their own channel named "Fab'n'Chic". Delfi likes Gaston, to the point where she pretends to be FelicityForNow after seeing how much Gaston likes the account. She then begins to better herself when she gets closer to Pedro.

Luna must juggle her new responsibilities, her new course load, and the drama of her various relationships while unfurling the mysteries of the disconcertingly real dreams she has of her past and future.

Season 2 (2017) 

The holidays are over and everyone returns home. Luna walks to a revealing truth, with illusion, in her reunion with Matteo. Nobody knows the secret that Matteo hides which is that he will leave to Oxford next year, but Luna is willing to fight with the wind and the air to find out. Over time, Luna helps Matteo to discover his true passion and he must cope with the pressure of his demanding father.

In the Benson mansion is a tense atmosphere after the arrival of Alfredo, father of Mrs. Sharon, changes the routine and brings back memories of the past. Luna feels a strong sympathy for this funny man who looks so much alike. This is because Alfredo is actually Luna's biological grandfather. Their relationship, with the help of Nina, marks a new personal path for Luna and helps investigate the mysteries of her past.

During this time The Jam and Roller is bought by Vidia (an online platform) which uses cameras to show the world what the Jam and Roller is like. Tamara (Instructor and Trainer) decides to leave and leaves Luna in charge. In a themed party, named the Roller Jam, Ambar destroys the cameras leading to the place burning down.

Everyone gets together to help rebuild it. Although Vidia isn't interested but they save el Jam and Roller with the help of Nina's father, Ricardo, who designs an app similar to Vidia's but much more features and better quality. The Jam and Roller is saved and they get a new instructor, Juliana, a strict and mean woman with a cane who was once a famous skater, Marissa Mint, who had an accident that ruined her career. Juliana was also one of the few skaters to receive the award of The Glass Skate, but she keeps the award and her career a secret.

Not only this but Rey and Sharon find out Luna is Sol Benson after Rey decided to investigate on Luna. So they make Ambar pretend to be Sol Benson to keep their future and fortune safe.

Holiday conflicts affect the group of others. Ambar, Jazmin, Delfi, Gastón, Ramiro and Matteo who are finishing their studies, must decide which way to go. Ambar is planning in walking Sharon's steps of studying business and law in Paris. Delfi decides to follow her passion for photography and Jazmin is undecided. Matteo decides he will become a professional musician and faces his father. Gaston plans on going to Oxford. Ramiro wants to live off his skating and rapping. During this time Delfi and Jazmin break off Ambar's friendship as they realize they are just puppets to her.

Ambar begins to get closer to Simon. She does this so that she can hurt Luna by taking her best friend from her. But when they spend more time together Ambar and Simon begin to fall in love.

During this time new characters arrive like an old foe of Simon appears, Benicio. Benicio and Simon worked in Foodger Wheels in Cancun together but Benicio was untrustworthy and stole money and blamed Simon. Benicio gets off on the wrong start with Juliana, as Benicio tries to take Simon's spot on the Roller Band but Juliana prohibits it. Benicio allies with Ambar and they break Juliana's glass skate. Benicio is discovered and is kicked out, but he doesn't reveal Ambar as his accomplice.

A new man appears, Garry, Nico's uncle who is an ex-surfer and business man with his own surf team. He becomes part owner of el Jam and Roller, he wants to change the name to his surf team's name, Red Sharks. The Roller's team enters a new competition, Roda Fest, where they meet their ultimate foes, The Sliders.

Both The Sliders and The Jam&Roller make it to the finals in Cancun, Mexico. Ambar is then discovered by Simon that she caused the fire and broke Juliana's Glass Skate. Ambar is spared from the authorities as Sharon uses all of her influences to protect her. Ambar is kicked out the team, so she allies herself with the leader of the Sliders, Emilia, to destroy the Roller's team.

Alfredo then discovers about Luna being Sol Benson but Sharon puts him in an asylum. She also fires Tino y Cato. Cato then goes to propose to Amanda and she says yes. Sharon discovers that Rey was blackmailing her threatening to reveal the truth about Luna. Sharon fires him, and Rey helps Alfredo escape and gives him the proof that Luna is Sol.

The Jam & Roller face off with the Sliders at Roda Fest. The Sliders win the competition but Luna wins the Glass Skate for el Jam & Roller. Luna then discovers her past with the help of Alfredo. Sharon escapes leaving Ambar behind telling her to lie and say she didn't know anything. Luna now knowing she is Sol Benson is more distant from Mateo. Meanwhile, Gary decides that the Jam & Roller exist no more, now giving birth to the Red Sharks.

Season 3 (2018) 

Luna/Sol, has returned with her adoptive parents and her grandfather to the Benson mansion in Argentina. The mansion is now theirs. Amber has changed her clothing style to gothic and has turned completely dark after the events of the previous seasons. A new boy named Erik has fallen in love with Nina and becomes a couple. Luna and Matteo gets closer and closer, as Emilia tries to drive them further and further apart, leading to Matteo to have a devastating accident, that leaves him in the hospital for quite some time, and leaves him with more or less memory, than he had before. the Roller Band gets kicked out of their apartment, so they move to Luna's house. and a new boy arrives named Michel, he moves into the house with the Roller Band, and finds an interest in Luna, and they get very close, which makes Matteo very jealous, later, Michel gets an offer to study abroad in Rome, Italy, and he asks Luna to choose for him, it is clear to Luna, that she still loves Matteo. Michel leaves for Rome and tells Luna to fight for Matteo's love, Simon tells Matteo that it was a misunderstanding, that Luna never was in love with Michel, and that Luna loves him. after Matteo hears this, he tells Luna that he loves her, the two get back together happily, and they both kiss. Meanwhile, Sharon wants to take revenge on her father and the Valentes and decides to go back to Buenos Aires in several disguises. Later in the season, Amber regained her normal clothing style, changed her attitude and became a couple with Simon. During the big series finale, the Roller team started performing with the song "Todo Puede Cambiar" and Luna and Matteo are back together again. Amber, Delfi and Jazmin have made up for it and are friends again. At the end Luna celebrates her 18th birthday and sings the song "Soy Yo" at her party, concluding the series.

Cast and characters

Main
 Karol Sevilla as Luna Valente
 Ruggero Pasquarelli as Matteo Balsano
 Valentina Zenere as Ámbar Smith
 Michael Ronda as Simón Álvarez
 Carolina Kopelioff as Nina Simonetti
 Malena Ratner as Delfina "Delfi" Alzamendi
 Agustín Bernasconi as Gastón Perida
 Katja Martínez as Jazmín Carbajal
 Ana Jara as Jimena "Jim" Medina
 Jorge López as Ramiro Ponce
 Chiara Parravicini as Yamila "Yam" Sánchez
 Gastón Vietto as Pedro Arias
 Lionel Ferro as Nicolás "Nico" Navarro
 Luz Cipriota as Tamara Ríos (season 1; guest season 2)
 Lucila Gandolfo as Sharon Benson
 Rodrigo Pedreira as Reinaldo "Rey" Guitierrez
 David Murí as Miguel Valente
 Ana Carolina Valsagna as Mónica Valente
 Diego Sassi as Tino (seasons 1–2)
 Germán Tripel as Cato (seasons 1–2)
 Antonella Querzoli as Amanda (seasons 1–2)
 Paula Kohan as Mora Barza (seasons 1–2; recurring season 3)
 Ezequiel Rodríguez as Ricardo Simonetti
 Caro Ibarra as Ana Castro
 Estela Ribeiro as Juliana (seasons 2–3)
 Roberto Carnaghi as Alfredo Benson (seasons 2–3)
 Jandino as Eric (season 3)
 Giovanna Reynaud as Emilia (season 3; recurring season 2)
 Pasquale Di Nuzzo as Benicio (season 3; recurring season 2)
 Vicky Suárez Battan as Maggie (season 3)
 Joaquín Berthold as Gary López (season 3; recurring season 2)

Music

Soundtrack albums

Remix album

Ratings 

Note: The ratings for the first season are only from Argentina. Those of the second season are from all countries from Latin America.

Awards and nominations

Broadcast 
The first season originally aired from March 14, 2016 to August 26, 2016 in Latin America. The series premiered on Disney Channel in Scandinavia on October 10, 2016. In the United States, the Spanish-language UniMás channel was set to air the series from April 17, 2017. However, the show was quietly taken off schedule. Eventually, the first season aired on February 20, 2018 on UniMás, and then later on Galavisión. After having a dormant entry for the series at launch, the first season was briefly made available on Disney+ with English subtitles in December 2019 before its official release on January 1, 2020. The second and third seasons followed on September 18, 2020.

Tours 
Soy Luna En Concierto (2016–2017)
 Soy Luna Live (2017–2018)
Soy Luna En Vivo (2018)

Notes

References

External links 
 

 
Television series by Disney
Disney Channel (Latin American TV channel) original programming
Pol-ka telenovelas
Musical television series
Argentine telenovelas
2016 Argentine television series debuts
2018 Argentine television series endings
2016 telenovelas
2017 telenovelas
Teen telenovelas
Disney Channel telenovelas
2018 telenovelas
Spanish-language Disney Channel original programming
Television series about teenagers